George Akuffo Dampare is a Ghanaian chartered accountant and police officer. He was appointed as the acting Inspector General of Police of the Ghana Police Service by President Nana Akufo-Addo on 21 July 2021 effective 1 August 2021, taking over from James Oppong-Boanuh who had been serving since October 2019.

Career
Dampare joined the Ghana Police Service in December 1990 at the age of 20 as a Police Constable in which he was adjudged the overall Best Recruit at the National Police Training School winning all awards except the award for the Best Marksman.

Prior to being appointed as IGP, Dampare served in different command and staff positions including Aide-de-camp to the Vice President, Director General (Finance), Director General (Welfare), Director General (ICT), Commandant of the Police Command and Staff College, Accra Regional Police Commander and Director General (Operations). On October 8, 2021, he was sworn in as the substantive Inspector General of Police (IGP) of the Ghana Police Service.

Personal life
Dampare is married with six children.

References 

Living people
Ghanaian police officers
Ghanaian accountants
1970 births